The white-lored euphonia or golden-bellied euphonia (Euphonia chrysopasta) is a songbird species of the family Fringillidae, having recently been moved there from the Thraupidae.

It is found in Bolivia, Brazil, Colombia, Ecuador, French Guiana, Guyana, Peru, Suriname, and Venezuela.

Its natural habitats are subtropical or tropical moist lowland forest and subtropical or tropical swamps.

References

white-lored euphonia
Birds of the Amazon Basin
Birds of the Guianas
white-lored euphonia
white-lored euphonia
white-lored euphonia
Taxonomy articles created by Polbot